Sachith Shanaka Pathirana (born 21 March 1989), is a former Sri Lankan cricketer, who played for the national team and domestically in first-class, List A and Twenty20 matches. Pathirana was a bowling all-rounder who bowled slow left-arm orthodox spin and left handed lower-middle order batsman. Presently he serves as the spin bowling coach of the Sri Lanka Under-19 cricket team.

Early life 
Pathirana grew up in Kandy and attended Trinity College where he captained the school's first XI.

Youth and domestic career
Pathirana played in Sri Lanka's 2006 ICC Under-19 Cricket World Cup team. He captained the Sri Lanka U-19 side aged just 17 in an ODI Triangular Series against England and Malaysia in 2007. At the 2008 ICC Under-19 Cricket World Cup he excelled by scoring 231 runs and claiming 10 wickets.

Pathirana is the leading wicket-taker for Sri Lanka in U19 ODIs with a total of 64 wickets in 23 matches.

He began his first class career at Colombo Cricket Club in 2008, moving to Ragama Cricket Club, before changing over to Chilaw Marians in 2012.

In March 2018, he was named in Kandy's squad for the 2017–18 Super Four Provincial Tournament. The following month, he was also named in Kandy's squad for the 2018 Super Provincial One Day Tournament.

In August 2018, he was named in Kandy's squad the 2018 SLC T20 League. He was the leading wicket-taker for Badureliya Sports Club in the 2018–19 Premier League Tournament, with 24 dismissals in nine matches.

International career
He made his One Day International (ODI) debut for Sri Lanka against Pakistan on 15 July 2015. He took 2 wickets for 54 runs. Together with Dinesh Chandimal, they put on a 50-run partnership, which helped Sri Lanka to win the match. Pathirana scored 33 runs in his first match.

He made his Twenty20 International (T20I) debut for Sri Lanka against Australia on 6 September 2016.

Pathirana scored his maiden ODI fifty on 10 February 2017 against South Africa at Centurion. However, his score was not enough for the team's victory and Sri Lanka lost the match by 88 runs and also the series 5–0.

Coaching career
Pathirana was appointed player-cum head coach of Badureliya Sports Club in 2018. In September 2019, he was appointed as spin bowling coach of Sri Lanka U-19 team.

References

External links
 

1989 births
Living people
Sri Lankan cricketers
Sri Lanka One Day International cricketers
Sri Lanka Twenty20 International cricketers
Badureliya Sports Club cricketers
Chilaw Marians Cricket Club cricketers
Colombo Cricket Club cricketers
Hambantota Troopers cricketers
Nagenahira Nagas cricketers
Ragama Cricket Club cricketers
Southern Express cricketers
Sri Lanka Cricket Combined XI cricketers
Sportspeople from Kandy
South Asian Games silver medalists for Sri Lanka
South Asian Games medalists in cricket